Epimeria is a genus of amphipods in the family Epimeriidae. There are more than 80 described species in Epimeria.

Species
These 85 species belong to the genus Epimeria:

 Epimeria abyssalis Shimomura & Tomikawa, 2016
 Epimeria acanthochelon dAcoz & Verheye, 2017
 Epimeria acanthurus (Schellenberg, 1931)
 Epimeria adeliae dAcoz & Verheye, 2017
 Epimeria amoenitas dAcoz & Verheye, 2017
 Epimeria angelikae (Lörz & Linse, 2011)
 Epimeria anguloce dAcoz & Verheye, 2017
 Epimeria annabellae Coleman, 1994
 Epimeria anodon dAcoz & Verheye, 2017
 Epimeria ashleyi (Lörz, 2012)
 Epimeria atalanta D'Udekem D'Acoz & Verheye, 2017
 Epimeria bathyalis Wakabara & Serejo, 1999
 Epimeria bispinosa Ledoyer, 1986
 Epimeria bruuni J.L.Barnard, 1961
 Epimeria callista dAcoz & Verheye, 2017
 Epimeria cinderella dAcoz & Verheye, 2017
 Epimeria cleo Verheye, Lörz & dAcoz, 2018
 Epimeria colemani dAcoz & Verheye, 2017
 Epimeria concordia Griffiths, 1977
 Epimeria cora J. L. Barnard, 1971
 Epimeria corbariae dAcoz & Verheye, 2017
 Epimeria cornigera (Fabricius, 1779)
 Epimeria cyphorachis dAcoz & Verheye, 2017
 Epimeria cyrano dAcoz & Verheye, 2017
 Epimeria debroyeri dAcoz & Verheye, 2017
 Epimeria emma Lörz & Coleman, 2014
 Epimeria extensa Andres, 1985
 Epimeria frankei Beermann & Raupach, 2018
 Epimeria gargantua dAcoz & Verheye, 2017
 Epimeria geodesiae (Bellan-Santini, 1972)
 Epimeria georgiana (Schellenberg, 1931)
 Epimeria glaucosa J.L.Barnard, 1961
 Epimeria grandirostris (Chevreux, 1912)
 Epimeria havermansiana dAcoz & Verheye, 2017
 Epimeria heldi (Coleman, 1998)
 Epimeria horsti Lörz, 2008
 Epimeria inermis (Walker, 1903)
 Epimeria intermedia (Schellenberg, 1931)
 Epimeria iota dAcoz & Verheye, 2017
 Epimeria kharieis dAcoz & Verheye, 2017
 Epimeria larsi (Lörz, 2009)
 Epimeria leukhoplites dAcoz & Verheye, 2017
 Epimeria linseae dAcoz & Verheye, 2017
 Epimeria loerzae dAcoz & Verheye, 2017
 Epimeria longispinosa K. H. Barnard, 1916
 Epimeria loricata G. O. Sars, 1879
 Epimeria macrodonta (Walker, 1906)
 Epimeria monodon Stephensen, 1947
 Epimeria morronei Winfield, Ortiz & Hendrickx, 2012
 Epimeria norfanzi Lörz, 2011
 Epimeria obtusa Watling, 1981
 Epimeria ortizi Varela & García-Gómez, 2015
 Epimeria oxicarinata (Coleman, 1990)
 Epimeria pacifica Gurjanova, 1955
 Epimeria pandora dAcoz & Verheye, 2017
 Epimeria parasitica (M.Sars, 1858)
 Epimeria pelagica Birstein & M.Vinogradov, 1958
 Epimeria pulchra (Coleman, 1990)
 Epimeria puncticulata K.H.Barnard, 1930
 Epimeria pyrodrakon dAcoz & Verheye, 2017
 Epimeria quasimodo dAcoz & Verheye, 2017
 Epimeria rafaeli Coleman & Lowry, 2014
 Epimeria reoproi (Lörz & Coleman, 2001)
 Epimeria rimicarinata (Watling & Holman, 1980)
 Epimeria robertiana dAcoz & Verheye, 2017
 Epimeria robusta (K.H.Barnard, 1930)
 Epimeria robustoides Lörz & Coleman, 2009
 Epimeria rotunda Wakabara & Serejo, 1999
 Epimeria rubrieques (De Broyer & Klages, 1991)
 Epimeria scabrosa (K.H.Barnard, 1930)
 Epimeria schiaparelli (Lörz, Maas, Linse & Fenwick, 2007)
 Epimeria semiarmata K.H.Barnard, 1916
 Epimeria similis (Chevreux, 1912)
 Epimeria sophie Lörz & Coleman, 2014
 Epimeria subcarinata Nagata, 1963
 Epimeria teres dAcoz & Verheye, 2017
 Epimeria truncata (Andres, 1985)
 Epimeria tuberculata G. O. Sars, 1893
 Epimeria ultraspinosa Wakabara & Serejo, 1999
 Epimeria urvillei dAcoz & Verheye, 2017
 Epimeria vaderi (Coleman, 1998)
 Epimeria victoria (Hurley, 1957)
 Epimeria walkeri (K.H.Barnard, 1930)
 Epimeria xesta dAcoz & Verheye, 2017
 Epimeria yaquinae McCain, 1971

References

Amphipoda
Articles created by Qbugbot
Malacostraca genera